Bloodline is an album by Kenny Neal. It earned Neal a Grammy Award nomination for Best Contemporary Blues Album.

References

2016 albums
Blues albums by American artists